Nephelotus aurivillii is a species of beetle in the family Cerambycidae. It was described by Ritsema in 1914. It is known from Sumatra.

References

Lamiini
Beetles described in 1914